The name Norma has been used for seven tropical cyclones in the Eastern Pacific Ocean.
 Tropical Storm Norma (1970)
 Hurricane Norma (1974)
 Hurricane Norma (1981)
 Hurricane Norma (1987)
 Tropical Storm Norma (1993)
 Tropical Storm Norma (2005)
 Hurricane Norma (2017)

Pacific hurricane set index articles